The Man Who Finally Died is a 1959 television drama. The seven-part serial aired on ITV, and was produced by ATV. Each episode was 30 minutes long. It was later remade as the 1963 film of the same name. Cast included Richard Pasco and Delphi Lawrence. The series still exists in its entirety

Plot
A man receives a message from his father...a man believed to have died during the Second World War

See also
The Voodoo Factor
The Gentle Killers
Five Names for Johnny
Motive for Murder

References

External links
 The Man Who Finally Died at IMDb

1959 British television series debuts
1959 British television series endings
1950s British drama television series
Black-and-white British television shows
English-language television shows
ITV television dramas
Television series by ITV Studios
1950s British television miniseries
Television shows adapted into films